Enypia griseata, the mountain girdle, is a species of geometrid moth in the family Geometridae. It is found in North America.

The MONA or Hodges number for Enypia griseata is 7006.

References

Further reading

External links

 

Ourapterygini
Articles created by Qbugbot
Moths described in 1908